Manuel "Manu" Navarro Sánchez (born 9 October 2000) is a Spanish footballer who plays for Hercules CF as a central midfielder.

Club career
Navarro was born in Móstoles, Community of Madrid, and joined CD Móstoles URJC's youth setup at the age of six. He made his senior debut with the main squad at the age of just 16 on 8 May 2016, being sent off in a 1–1 Tercera División away draw against CDC Moscardó.

In June 2016, Navarro moved to Rayo Vallecano, returning to the youth setup. Promoted to the reserves for the 2018–19 season, he immediately became a starter for the side before struggling with an ankle injury during the most of the 2019–20 campaign.

Navarro made his first team debut for Rayo on 16 January 2021, coming on as a late substitute for Álvaro García in a 2–0 home win against Elche CF, for the season's Copa del Rey. He made his Segunda División debut on 30 March, replacing Andrés Martín in a 1–0 home loss against Sporting de Gijón.

On 27 July 2022, Navarro signed for Segunda División RFEF side Hércules CF.

References

External links

2000 births
Living people
People from Móstoles
Spanish footballers
Footballers from the Community of Madrid
Association football midfielders
Segunda División players
Tercera División players
Tercera Federación players
CD Móstoles URJC players
Rayo Vallecano B players
Rayo Vallecano players
Hércules CF players